Fluctuadmission is the only demo by Frantic Bleep to give to music labels.

It was recorded at Huset and Tora Bora Studios. All engineering, producing and mixing were done by guitarist Patrick Scantlebury. It was mastered at Lydmuren by Fritjof. All songs are by Frantic Bleep while the lyrics are by Paul Mozart Bjørke. The cover art was by Christian Ruud.

Track listing
 "Fluctuadmission" (Scantlebury, Renstrøm) – 5:03
 "The 3rd Stage" (Scantlebury) - 5:12
 "Mandaughter" (Scantlebury, Sundstrøm) – 5:56
 "To Bleep or Not to Bleep…?" (Scantlebury, Sundstrøm) - 2:55

Credits
 Patrick Scantlebury - lead guitar, synthesizers, production, engineering, mixing
 Eywin Sundstrøm - guitar
 Karl Arthur Renstrøm - drums
 Paul Mozart Bjørke - vocals, bass

2002 albums
Frantic Bleep albums